Rerum may refer to :

Lacrimae rerum is the Latin for tears for things.
Rerum novarum is an encyclical issued by Pope Leo XIII on May 16, 1891. 
Rerum Moscoviticarum Commentarii was a Latin book by Baron Sigismund von Herberstein on the geography, history and customs of Muscovy.
Rerum Deus Tenax Vigor is the daily hymn for None in the Roman Catholic Breviary.
Silva rerum was a specific type of a book, a multi-generational chronicle.